Irfan Bhatti may refer to:

 Irfan Bhatti (cricketer, born 1964), Pakistani cricketer
 Irfan Bhatti (cricketer, born 1979), Kuwaiti cricketer

See also
 Muhammad Irfan Saeed Bhatti (born 1992), Pakistani badminton player